The 1928 Weltklasse Zürich (Original: Internationales Leichtathletik-Meeting in Zürich) was an outdoor track and field meeting in Zürich, Switzerland.

Results international

100 m international

Heat 1

Heat 2

Final

200 m international

400 m international

800 m international

5000 m international

4×100 m international

Longjump international

Discus throw international

Shot put international

Results national

100 m-Final national

Preliminary heat 1

Preliminary heat 2

Preliminary heat 3

Intermediate heat 1

Intermediate heat 2

Final

200 m-Final national

400 m-Final national

Preliminary heat 1

Preliminary heat 2

Final

1500 m national

5000 m national

400 m hurdles national

Long jump national

High jump national

Discus throw national

Javelin throw national

Preliminary

Final

References

1928
Weltklasse Zürich